Joseph Stafford (10 March 1918 – 17 June 2000) was a Gaelic footballer who played for the Cavan county team.

Playing career
Stafford played at right full forward and was a prolific goalscorer for Cavan in the 1940s. He is 9th in All-time top Ulster goalscorers chart. His goal was crucial in securing Cavan's famous victory in the All-Ireland Senior Football Championship Final in Polo Grounds, New York in 1947. He helped Cavan retain the title the following year against Co. Mayo. He also won a National Football League medal in 1949/50 season. Joe Stafford was the first man to be sent off in an All-Ireland final. He had been ordered off with fifteen minutes left in the 1943 All-Ireland Senior Football Championship Final against Roscommon. His nephew, Jimmy Stafford, also played with Cavan in the 1960s and 1970s.

References

1918 births
2000 deaths
Cavan inter-county Gaelic footballers
Gaelic football forwards